Duff is a given name, almost always masculine, which may refer to:

Men
 Dub, King of Scotland (died 967), sometimes anglicised as Duff MacMalcolm
 Duff Bruce, Scottish footballer in the 1920s
 Duff Cooley (1873–1937), American baseball player
 Duff Cooper (1890–1954), British politician, diplomat and author
 Duff Gibson (born 1966), Canadian retired skeleton racer and Olympic and world champion
 Duff Green (1791–1875), American teacher, military leader, politician, journalist, author, diplomat, industrialist and businessman
 Duff Hart-Davis (born 1936), British biographer, naturalist and journalist
 Duff Wilson, American investigative reporter

Women
 Duff Twysden (1893–1938), British socialite best known as the inspiration for Brett Ashley in Hemingway's novel The Sun Also Rises

See also
 Duff (nickname)

Masculine given names